Abgarm is a city in Qazvin Province, Iran.

Abgarm or Ab-e Garm or Ab Garm or Ab-i-Garm or Abegarm may refer to:

Ardabil Province
 Ab-e Garm-e Givy, a village in Kowsar County

East Azerbaijan Province
 Ab-e Garm, East Azerbaijan, a village in Charuymaq County

Fars Province
Abgarm, Fasa, a village in Fasa County
Ab-e Garm, Kazerun, a village in Kazerun County
Abgarm-e Pir Sohabi, a village in Kazerun County
Abgarm, Mamasani, a village in Mamasani County
Ab Garm-e Olya, a village in Mamasani County
Abgarm, Marvdasht, a village in Marvdasht County
Ab Garm, Qir and Karzin, a village in Qir and Karzin County
Ab Garm, Sepidan, a village in Sepidan County

Hormozgan Province
 Ab Garm, Bandar Abbas, Hormozgan Province
 Ab Garm, Rudan, Hormozgan Province
 Abgarm, Hajjiabad, Hormozgan Province

Isfahan Province
 Abgarm, Tiran and Karvan, a village in Tiran and Karvan County

Kerman Province
 Ab-e Garm, Ganjabad, a village in Anbarabad County
 Ab Garm, Hoseynabad, a village in Anbarabad County
 Abgarm, Jebalbarez-e Jonubi, a village in Anbarabad County
 Ab Garm, Bam, a village in Bam County
 Ab Garm-e Seyyedi, a village in Bam County
 Abgarm, Bardsir, a village in Bardsir County
 Abgarm, Dalfard, a village in Jiroft County
 Abgarm, Gevar, a village in Jiroft County
 Abgarm, Jebalbarez, a village in Jiroft County
 Ab Garm 1, a village in Jiroft County
 Ab Garm, Narmashir, a village in Narmashir County
 Ab Garm, Rabor, a village in Rabor County
 Abegarm, Rigan, a village in Rigan County
 Abgarm, Rudbar-e Jonubi, a village in Rudbar-e Jonubi County

Markazi Province
 Ab Garm-e Bala, Markazi Province

Mazandaran Province
 Ab-e Garm, Mazandaran, a village in Amol County

Qazvin Province
 Abgarm District, in Qazvin Province
 Abgarm Rural District, in Qazvin Province

Razavi Khorasan Province
 Abgarm, Razavi Khorasan

South Khorasan Province
 Ab Garm, South Khorasan

West Azerbaijan Province
 Ab-e Garm, Chaldoran, a village in Chaldoran County
 Abgarm, Salmas, a village in Salmas County

See also
 Ab Garmeh (disambiguation)
 Ab Garmu (disambiguation)